Kanbawza may refer to:
 Kanbawza, a classical Pali name of Taunggyi, Shan States (in modern-day Myanmar)
 Kanbawzathadi Palace, a palace of King Bayinnaung in Bago, Bago Division
 Kanbawza F.C., a football club based out of Taunggyi, Shan State
 Kanbawza Group of Companies
 Kanbawza Bank, a private bank in Myanmar